Wallarah is a sparsely populated suburb of the Central Coast region of New South Wales, Australia. It is part of the Central Coast Council local government area.

It is home to the Wallarah Creek interchange on the M1 Pacific Motorway.

References

Suburbs of the Central Coast (New South Wales)